The Point Cook Football Club, nicknamed The Bulldogs, is an Amateur Australian rules football club, based in the Melbourne suburb of Point Cook, playing in the Western Region Football League (WRFL). The club was founded in 2003 as a junior club and expanded to senior teams in 2010. Point Cook's home ground is Saltwater Reserve. It is located on the Cnr of Saltwater Promenade & Point Cook Road, Point Cook 3030

History
The Point Cook Football Club was established in October 2003 as an Australian Rules Junior Football Club, catering for the needs of Junior footballers in the Point Cook and surrounding areas. 2004 was the first year of football competing in the Western Region Football League (WRFL).

Due to the growth of the members and the need for Senior football in the area, the Point Cook Football Club entered Senior and Reserve teams in the Victorian Amateur Football Association (VAFA) in season 2010.

In 2014 the Point Cook Football Club fielded their very first 'Youth Girls' team with players aged between 13 – 18 competing against other girls the same age. In 2015 the Point Cook Football Club fielded their first 'Superules' team with players aged over 35 competing against other teams in the AFL Masters, Victorian Metropolitan League

Following a Special Meeting of the members and a vote the club moved its Senior & Reserve Sides from the Victorian Amateur Football Association (VAFA) Division 3 to enter the Western Region Football League (WRFL) in Division 2 for the 2018 Season.

In 2018 the Club entered 2 teams (Point Cook Blue & Point Cook Red) into the Western Region Football League (WRFL) Inaugural netball Competition, where Point Cook Blue won the Inaugural Victoria University Western Region Football League (WRFL) Netball Premiership Defeating Braybrook Red by 34 goals.

Also in 2018 in its first year in the Western Region Football League (WRFL) Division 2 competition the Seniors took out the Premiership Defeating Yarraville Seddon Eagles by 7 points at Avalon Airport Oval, Werribee. Gaining promotion into Division 1 in Season 2019.

Due to the growth of Female Football, the Club entered a Senior Women's team into the Western Region Football League (WRFL) Competition for the 2019 Season.

In June 2022, Point Cook Junior Massimo D'Ambrosio, was selected at Pick 3 in the 2022 AFL Mid Season Draft, by Essendon. Massimo became the first Point Cook Junior to be drafted by an AFL Club. And in Round 14 2022 Massimo made his AFL debut against St Kilda. 2 weeks later Massimo was the Round 16 NAB AFL Rising Star Nominee for his match against Sydney.

Club honours

Honour Board

Best Clubperson
Shane Comino - 2005
Derek Gatt - 2006
Wayne Gough - 2007
Sam Lachimia - 2008
Susanne Gough - 2009
Julie Ward - 2009
Anthony MacGibbon - 2010
Shane Comino - 2012
Toni Waugh - 2013
David Cook - 2014
Andrew Gough - 2015
Karen Cook - 2016
Rachael Archer - 2017
Toni Waugh - 2017
Peter Gardner - 2018
Andrew Gough - 2018
Donna Morgan - 2019
David Rouvray - 2019
Scott Johnston - 2021
Kirk Heberle - 2022

Life Members
Steve Ward - 2013
Shane Comino - 2013
Wayne Gough - 2014
Anthony MacGibbon - 2015
Andrew Gough - 2019
Ivo Havard - 2022
Peter Gardner - 2022

Premierships: 18
Senior: 1
Division 2 (WRFL) - 2018 (Point Cook 9.14 - 68 Def Yarraville Seddon Eagles 8.13 - 61)
Netball: 1
Netball (WRFL) - 2018 (Point Cook Blue 47 Def Braybrook Red 13)
Under 18: 1
Under 18 Division 2 (WRFL) - 2011 (Point Cook 12.9 - 81 Def Deer Park 6.10 - 46)
Junior: 15
Under 14 Division D (WRFL) - 2008 (Point Cook 11.11 - 77 Def Flemington Juniors 5.5 - 35)
Under 13 Division B (WRFL) - 2011 (Point Cook 4.12 - 36 Def Caroline Springs 4.5 - 29)
Under 11 Division A (WRFL) - 2014 (Point Cook 6.5 - 41 Def Williamstown Juniors 0.2 - 2)
Under 11 Division C (WRFL) - 2014 (Point Cook 6.11 - 47 Def Wyndham Suns 5.3 - 33)
Under 13 Division A (WRFL) - 2016 (Point Cook 10.10 - 70 Def Williamstown Juniors 8.6 - 54)
Under 13 Division C (WRFL) - 2016 (Point Cook 5.2 - 32 Def Caroline Springs 2.5 - 17)
Under 15 Division 2 (WRFL) - 2017 (Point Cook 10.7 - 67 Def Albion 8.16 - 64)
Under 14 Division 1 (WRFL) - 2017 (Point Cook 12.20 - 92 Def Caroline Springs 5.14 - 44)
Under 13 Division 1 (WRFL) - 2017 (Point Cook 10.14 - 74 Def St Bernard's 5.10 - 40)
Under 14 Division 1 (WRFL) - 2018 (Point Cook 6.12 - 48 Def St Bernard's 1.2 - 8)
Under 13 Division 1 (WRFL) - 2018 (Point Cook 5.8 - 38 Def Williamstown Juniors 3.5 - 23)
Under 16 Division 1 (WRFL) - 2019 (Point Cook 7.13 - 55 Def Caroline Springs 6.9 - 45)
Under 14 Division 1 (WRFL) - 2019 (Point Cook 7.6 - 48 Def Williamstown Juniors 2.3 - 15)
Under 12 Division 3 (WRFL) - 2019 (Point Cook 9.9 - 63 Def Newport Power Juniors 1.3 - 9)
Under 14 Division 1 (WRFL) - 2022 (Point Cook 5.9 - 39 Def Williamstown Juniors 5.4 - 34)

League Best & Fairest: 25
Senior Men: 1
Jordan Lampi - VAFA Division 4 Seniors - 2012

Senior Women: 1
Kymberly Bays - WRFL Senior Women Division 1  - 2021

Netball: 2
Jenna Goricanec - WRFL Netball - 2018
Jane Goodier - WRFL Netball Division 2 - 2021

Under 18: 3
Jordan Lampi - WRFL Under 18 Division 2 - 2011
Jessi Lampi - WRFL Under 18 Division 1 - 2012
Kai Logan - WRFL Under 18 Division 2 - 2021

Junior: 18
Elliott Phasey - WRFL Under 14 Division D - 2005
Andrew Gilmore - WRFL Under 16 Division C - 2007
Samuel Georgiovski - WRFL Under 14 Division D - 2007
Nicholas Buykx - WRFL Under 15 Division A - 2013
 - WRFL Under 11 Division A - 2013
 - WRFL Under 11 Division A - 2014
Joshua Kuppen - WRFL Under 11 Division C - 2014
 - WRFL Under 12 Division A - 2015
Bailey Moffatt - WRFL Under 14 Division 1 - 2017
 - WRFL Under 15 Division 1 - 2018
Diesel Moloney - WRFL Under 14 Division 1 - 2019
Thomas Burton - WRFL Under 12 Division 1 - 2019
Nazzareno Foti - WRFL Under 12 Division 4 - 2019
Michael Cilmi - WRFL Under 16 Division 1 - 2021
Max Clark - WRFL Under 12 Division 1 - 2021
Thomas Burton - WRFL Under 14 Division 1 - 2022
Angus Tippett - WRFL Under 14 Division 1 - 2022
Braith Lafaialii - WRFL Under 12 Division 1 - 2022

AFL Players
 -  2022 -

Seniors

Senior Honour Board

Senior Team records

Senior Record against other clubs

VAFA (2010 - 2017)

WRFL (2018 - )

Overall

References

External links
 Official website of the Point Cook Football Club
 Official Facebook Page
 Official Twitter Page
 Official Club App
 VAFA website
 WRFL website

Western Region Football League clubs
Australian rules football clubs established in 2003
2003 establishments in Australia
Australian rules football clubs in Melbourne
Sport in the City of Wyndham